The 2020–21 Baylor Lady Bears basketball team represented Baylor University in the 2020–21 NCAA Division I women's basketball season. The team played its home games at the Ferrell Center in Waco, Texas and were members of the Big 12 Conference. They were led by Hall of Fame coach Kim Mulkey in her 20th season.

This was the final season in which Baylor women's basketball used the "Lady Bears" nickname. On September 3, 2021, Baylor announced that the last three women's teams that were still using "Lady Bears", namely basketball, soccer, and volleyball, would be known simply as "Bears" from that point forward.

Previous season
The Lady Bears finished the 2018–19 season with a record of 28–2, 17–1 in Big 12 to win the Big 12 regular season title. They qualified for the Big 12 women's tournament, which, along with the NCAA women's tournament, was canceled due to the COVID-19 pandemic.

Offseason

Departures

Roster

Schedule

|-
!colspan=12 style=| Regular Season

|-
!colspan=9 style=| Big 12 Women's Tournament

|-
!colspan=9 style=| NCAA tournament

source:

Rankings

See also
2020–21 Big 12 Conference women's basketball season
2020–21 NCAA Division I women's basketball season
2020–21 Baylor Bears basketball team - men's team

References

Baylor Bears women's basketball seasons
Baylor
Baylor
Baylor
Baylor